Nasima Khan (born 1944) is a Bangladeshi film actress। She is one of the oldest actresses of Bangladeshi film. In 1959, she came to Bengali film industries with the film Jago Hua Savera, directed by A.J. Kardar. From the sixties to the 1980s, she was popular in Bengali films and also Urdu films.

Filmography

See also
 Rani Sarker

References

External links

1944 births
Living people
Bangladeshi film actresses
Bangladeshi television actresses
Bengali actresses
Actresses in Bengali cinema